Luisana Pérez may refer to:

 Luisana Pérez (journalist), director of Hispanic media for the Joe Biden administration
 Luisana Pérez (table tennis), Venezuela table tennis player